Rufino José Cuervo Urisarri (Bogotá, Colombia), was a Colombian writer, linguist, and philologist.

He studied Latin and Greek, but the main part of his work was dedicated to the study of the dialectal variations of Spanish spoken in Colombia. About this topic, he wrote his book Apuntaciones críticas sobre lenguaje bogotano (Critical Notes About Bogotan Language, 1867), which is still an important reference in the study of the American Spanish language.

His most important work was Diccionario de construcción y régimen de la lengua castellana (Dictionary of Castilian language construction and rection).
This work is updated on a regular basis by the Caro y Cuervo Institute. Cuervo also revised and republished the Spanish American grammar of Andrés Bello, Castilian Grammar for Americans.

Cuervo was one of the first linguists who promoted the union of the Spanish language in its different variants. He was worried about the segregationist trend in spoken Spanish and thought that this phenomenon was similar to the events following the fall of the Roman Empire, after which Latin gradually began splitting into several independent Romance languages, such as Spanish, Portuguese and Italian.

In 1878 he was admitted as the Colombian representative to the Real Academia Española. In 1882 he moved to Paris, where he lived until his death in 1911.

References

 http://www.universia.net.co/index2.php?option=com_content&do_pdf=1&id=5752
 Rufino José Cuervo – MSN Encarta

External links

Colombian male writers
Linguists from Colombia
Philologists
Members of the Mexican Academy of Language
Burials at Père Lachaise Cemetery
1844 births
1911 deaths